The International Partnership for Hydrogen and Fuel Cells in the Economy (IPHE) is an international collaborative initiative for the development and deployment of hydrogen and fuel cell technologies and to enable global energy security and other environmental and economic benefits that these technologies can provide. The IPHE membership is open to national governmental entities that have made significant commitments to invest resources in research, development, and demonstration activities to advance hydrogen and fuel cell technologies.

Related Article: FCHEA

Background 
The IPHE Terms of Reference that were signed in November 2003 created a steering committee that governs the overall framework and activities of the IPHE. The mission of the IPHE is to serve as a mechanism to share information among partners to enable the organization and implementation of international research, development, demonstration, and deployment activities that are related to hydrogen and fuel cell technologies. The organization also provides a forum for sharing information on new policies as well as common codes and standards that are built for the transition to hydrogen and fuel cells in a global economy for energy security and environmental protection.

The four strategic priorities which guide the activities of the organization include:

 Accelerating the market penetration and early adoption of hydrogen and fuel cell technologies and their supporting infrastructure
 Supporting widespread deployment through policy and regulatory activities
 Raising the profile with policy-makers and the public
 Monitoring hydrogen, fuel cell and complementary technology developments

The two primary working groups within IPHE are the Education Working Group and the Regulations, Codes, and Standards (RCS) Working Group.  The Education Working Group focuses on sharing practices and ideas on methods to increase education and outreach activities, including recognition programs such as student awards.

The RCS Working Group has focused on many activities related to sharing information on safety and protocol development related to testing hydrogen systems, including round-robin testing of hydrogen tanks in several countries. Task Forces are also created to accelerate activities in specific areas as needed, such as the Task Force on Sharing Information on Policies and Incentives that May Allow for the Commercialization of Hydrogen and Fuel Cell Technologies.

IPHE organizes several workshops and events for stakeholders that are aligned with its mission.

In July 2005, the G8 Summit endorsed the IPHE in its Plan of Action on Climate Change, Clean Energy, and Sustainable Development and identified it as a medium of cooperation and collaboration to develop clean energy technologies. 

Similar designations were also made in bilateral activities that include:
 The joint statement of the U.S.-European Union Summit on Energy Security, Energy Efficiency, Renewables, and Economic Development 
 The Mainz Declaration of Germany and the United States on Cleaner and More Efficient Energy, Development, and Climate Change

Note: When it was formed in 2003, the IPHE stood for "International Partnership for the Hydrogen Economy." The name was changed in 2009  to ensure the inclusion of fuel cell technologies within the scope of the partnership.

References

External links 

 Official website

Energy organizations